Bageshwari is a town in Banke District in the Bheri Zone of south-western Nepal.  At the time of the 1991 Nepal census it had a population of 9,740 and had 1711 houses in the town.

References

Populated places in Banke District